This is a list of the native wild mammal species recorded in Central America. Central America is usually defined as the southernmost extension of North America; however, from a biological standpoint it is useful to view it as a separate region of the Americas. Central America is distinct from the remainder of North America in being a tropical region, part of the Neotropical realm, whose flora and fauna display a strong South American influence. The rest of North America is mostly subtropical or temperate, belongs to the Nearctic realm, and has far fewer species of South American origin.

At present Central America bridges North and South America, facilitating migrations in both directions, but this phenomenon is relatively recent from a geological perspective. The formation of this land bridge through volcanic activity three million years ago precipitated the Great American Interchange, an important biogeographical event. In part because of this history, Central America is extremely biodiverse; it comprises most of the Mesoamerican biodiversity hotspot. The mountains running down the spine of Central America have also contributed to biodiversity by creating montane habitats, including cloud forests and grasslands, and by separating species from the lowlands along the Pacific and Caribbean coasts. However, Central America's biodiversity suffered a blow in the Quaternary extinction event, which started around 12,500 cal BP, at roughly the time of arrival of Paleoindians; much of the megafauna died out at this time. The effects of modern human activities on climate and ecosystem integrity pose a further threat to Central America's fauna.

This list consists of those mammal species found from the Isthmus of Tehuantepec to the northwestern border of Colombia, a region including the Mexican states of Chiapas, Tabasco, Campeche, Yucatán and Quintana Roo, and the nations of Belize, Guatemala, El Salvador, Honduras, Nicaragua, Costa Rica and Panama. As of May 2012, the list contains 378 species, 177 genera, 47 families and 13 orders. Of the taxa from nonflying, nonmarine groups (203 species, 91 genera, 31 families and 10 orders), those of South American origin (opossums, xenarthrans, monkeys and caviomorph rodents) comprise 21% of species, 34% of genera, 52% of families and 50% of orders. Thus, South America's contribution to Central America's biodiversity is fairly modest at the species level, but substantial at higher taxonomic levels. In comparison to South America, a famously biodiverse continent, Central America has 27% as many species, 51% as many genera, 81% as many families and 86% as many orders (considering noncetacean taxa only), while having only 4.3% of the land area.

Of the species, two are extinct, eleven are critically endangered, thirteen are endangered, twenty are vulnerable, twenty are near threatened, thirty-five are data deficient and five are not yet evaluated. Mammal species presumed extinct since AD 1500 (two cases) are included. Domestic species and introduced species are not listed.

Note: this list is almost inevitably going to be incomplete, since new species are continually being recognized via discovery or reclassification. Places to check for missing species include the Wikipedia missing mammal species list, including recently removed entries, and the species listings in the articles for mammalian genera, especially those of small mammals such as rodents or bats.

The following tags are used to highlight each species' conservation status as assessed by the International Union for Conservation of Nature; those on the left are used here, those in the second column in some other articles:

The IUCN status of the listed species was last updated between November 2008 and March 2009.

Subclass: Theria

Infraclass: Metatheria

Marsupials are an infraclass of pouched mammals that was once more widely distributed. Today they are found primarily in isolated or formerly isolated continents of Gondwanan origin. Those of Central America are relatively recent immigrants from South America. Central America's 10 extant genera compares with 22 in South America, 1 in North America north of Mexico, 52 in Australia, 28 in New Guinea and 2 in Sulawesi. South American marsupials are thought to be ancestral to those of Australia and elsewhere.

Superorder: Ameridelphia

Order: Didelphimorphia (common opossums)

Didelphimorphia is the order of common opossums of the Western Hemisphere. Opossums probably diverged from the basic South American marsupials in the late Cretaceous or early Paleocene. They are small to medium-sized marsupials, about the size of a large house cat, with a long snout and prehensile tail.

Family: Didelphidae (American opossums)
Subfamily: Caluromyinae
Genus: Caluromys
 Derby's woolly opossum, C. derbianus 
Subfamily: Didelphinae
Genus: Chironectes
 Water opossum, Chironectes minimus 
Genus: Didelphis
 Common opossum, Didelphis marsupialis 
 Virginia opossum, Didelphis virginiana 
Genus: Marmosa
Subgenus: Exulomarmosa
 Isthmian mouse opossum, Marmosa isthmica
 Mexican mouse opossum, Marmosa mexicana 
 Robinson's mouse opossum, Marmosa robinsoni 
 Marmosa zeledoni NE
Subgenus: Micoureus
 Alston's mouse opossum, Marmosa alstoni 
Genus: Marmosops
 Panama slender opossum, Marmosops invictus 
Genus: Metachirus
 Brown four-eyed opossum, Metachirus nudicaudatus 
Genus: Monodelphis
 Sepia short-tailed opossum, Monodelphis adusta 
Genus: Philander
 Gray four-eyed opossum, Philander opossum 
Genus: Tlacuatzin
 Grayish mouse opossum, Tlacuatzin canescens

Infraclass: Eutheria

Superorder Afrotheria

Order: Sirenia (manatees and dugongs)

Sirenia is an order of fully aquatic, herbivorous mammals that inhabit rivers, estuaries, coastal marine waters, swamps, and marine wetlands. All four extant species are endangered. They evolved about 50 million years ago, and their closest living relatives are elephants. The manatees are the only extant afrotherians in the Americas. However, a number proboscid species, some of which survived until the arrival of Paleoindians, once inhabited the region. Mammoths, mastodons and gomphotheres all reached Central America.

Family: Trichechidae
Genus: Trichechus
 West Indian manatee, Trichechus manatus VU

Superorder Xenarthra

Order: Cingulata (armadillos)

The armadillos are small mammals with a bony armored shell. Two of 21 extant species are present in Central America; the remainder are only found in South America, where they originated. Their much larger relatives, the pampatheres and glyptodonts, once lived in North and South America but became extinct following the appearance of humans.

Family: Dasypodidae (long-nosed armadillos)
Subfamily: Dasypodinae
Genus: Dasypus
 Nine-banded armadillo, D. novemcinctus LC
Family: Chlamyphoridae (armadillos)
Subfamily: Tolypeutinae
Genus: Cabassous
 Northern naked-tailed armadillo, C. centralis DD

Order: Pilosa (sloths and anteaters)

The order Pilosa is confined to the Americas and contains the tree sloths and anteaters (which include the tamanduas). Although their ancestral home is South America, all 5 extant genera and 6 of 10 extant species are present in Central America. Numerous ground sloths, some of which reached the size of elephants, were once present in both North and South America, as well as on the Antilles, but all went extinct following the arrival of humans. Extant two-toed sloths are more closely related to some extinct ground sloths than to three-toed sloths.

Suborder: Folivora
Family: Bradypodidae (three-toed sloths)
Genus: Bradypus
 Pygmy three-toed sloth, Bradypus pygmaeus CR
 Brown-throated sloth, Bradypus variegatus LC
Family: Choloepodidae (two-toed sloths)
Genus: Choloepus
 Hoffmann's two-toed sloth, Choloepus hoffmanni LC
Suborder: Vermilingua
Family: Cyclopedidae (silky anteaters)
Genus: Cyclopes
 Silky anteater, C. didactylus  LC
Central American silky anteater, C. dorsalis 
Family: Myrmecophagidae (American anteaters)
Genus: Myrmecophaga
 Giant anteater, Myrmecophaga tridactyla VU
Genus: Tamandua
 Northern tamandua, Tamandua mexicana LC

Superorder Euarchontoglires

Order: Primates

The order Primates includes the lemurs, monkeys, and apes, with the latter category including humans. It is divided into four main groupings: strepsirrhines, tarsiers, monkeys of the New World (parvorder Platyrrhini), and monkeys and apes of the Old World. Central America's 6 genera of nonhuman primates compares with 20 in South America, 15 in Madagascar, 23 in Africa and 19 in Asia. Central American monkeys are recent immigrants from South America, where their ancestors arrived after rafting over from Africa 25 million years ago.

Parvorder: Platyrrhini (New World monkeys)
Family: Aotidae (night monkeys)
Genus: Aotus
 Panamanian night monkey, Aotus zonalis DD – may be A. lemurinus VU subspecies
Family: Callitrichidae (marmosets and tamarins)
Genus: Saguinus
 Geoffroy's tamarin, Saguinus geoffroyi LC
Family: Cebidae (capuchin and squirrel monkeys)
Subfamily: Cebinae
Genus: Cebus
 Colombian white-faced capuchin, Cebus capucinus LC
 Panamanian white-faced capuchin, Cebus imitator NE
Subfamily: Saimiriinae
Genus: Saimiri
 Central American squirrel monkey, Saimiri oerstedii VU
Family: Atelidae (howler, spider and woolly monkeys)
Subfamily: Alouattinae
Genus: Alouatta
 Coiba Island howler, Alouatta coibensis VU – may be A. palliata subspecies
 Mantled howler, Alouatta palliata LC
 Guatemalan black howler, Alouatta pigra EN
Subfamily: Atelinae
Genus: Ateles
 Black-headed spider monkey, Ateles fusciceps CR
 Geoffroy's spider monkey, Ateles geoffroyi EN

Order: Rodentia (rodents)

Rodents make up the largest order of mammals, with over 40% of mammalian species. They have two incisors in the upper and lower jaw which grow continually and must be kept short by gnawing. Central America's 11 species of caviomorph rodents (10% of its total rodent species) are recent immigrants from South America, where their ancestors washed ashore after rafting across the Atlantic from Africa over 30 million years ago. The remainder of Central America's rodents are of Nearctic origin. Ancestral sigmodontine rodents apparently island-hopped from Central America to South America 5 or more million years ago, prior to the formation of the Panamanian land bridge. They went on to diversify explosively, and now comprise 60% of South America's rodent species, while only making up 27% of Central America's.

Suborder: Hystricomorpha
Parvorder: Caviomorpha
Family: Erethizontidae (New World porcupines)
Subfamily: Erethizontinae
Genus: Coendou
 Andean porcupine, Coendou quichua DD
 Rothschild's porcupine, Coendou rothschildi LC
 Mexican hairy dwarf porcupine, Coendou mexicanus LC
Family: Caviidae (guinea pigs)
Subfamily: Hydrochoerinae (capybaras and rock cavies)
Genus: Hydrochoerus
 Lesser capybara, Hydrochoerus isthmius DD
Family: Dasyproctidae
Genus: Dasyprocta
 Coiban agouti, Dasyprocta coibae VU
 Mexican agouti, Dasyprocta mexicana CR
 Central American agouti, Dasyprocta punctata LC
 Ruatan Island agouti, Dasyprocta ruatanica EN
Family: Cuniculidae
Genus: Cuniculus
 Lowland paca, Cuniculus paca LC
Family: Echimyidae
Subfamily: Echimyinae
Genus: Diplomys
 Rufous soft-furred spiny-rat, Diplomys labilis LC
Subfamily: Eumysopinae
Genus: Hoplomys
 Armored rat, Hoplomys gymnurus LC
Genus: Proechimys
 Tome's spiny-rat, Proechimys semispinosus LC
Family: Capromyidae
Subfamily: Capromyinae
Genus: Geocapromys
 Little Swan Island hutia, †Geocapromys thoracatus EX

Suborder: Sciuromorpha
Family: Sciuridae (squirrels)
Subfamily: Sciurinae
Tribe: Sciurini
Genus: Microsciurus
 Central American dwarf squirrel, Microsciurus alfari LC
 Western dwarf squirrel, Microsciurus mimulus LC
Genus: Sciurus
 Mexican gray squirrel, Sciurus aureogaster VU
 Deppe's squirrel, Sciurus deppei LC
 Red-tailed squirrel, Sciurus granatensis LC
 Richmond's squirrel, Sciurus richmondi NT
 Variegated squirrel, Sciurus variegatoides LC
 Yucatan squirrel, Sciurus yucatanensis LC
Genus: Syntheosciurus
 Bangs's mountain squirrel, Syntheosciurus brochus NT
Suborder: Castorimorpha
Family: Geomyidae
Genus: Orthogeomys
 Chiriqui pocket gopher, Orthogeomys cavator LC
 Cherrie's pocket gopher, Orthogeomys cherriei LC
 Oaxacan pocket gopher, Orthogeomys cuniculus DD
 Darien pocket gopher, Orthogeomys dariensis LC
 Giant pocket gopher, Orthogeomys grandis LC
 Variable pocket gopher, Orthogeomys heterodus LC
 Hispid pocket gopher, Orthogeomys hispidus LC
 Nicaraguan pocket gopher, Orthogeomys matagalpae LC
 Underwood's pocket gopher, Orthogeomys underwoodi LC
Family: Heteromyidae
Subfamily: Heteromyinae
Genus: Heteromys
 Panamanian spiny pocket mouse, Heteromys adspersus LC
 Southern spiny pocket mouse, Heteromys australis LC
 Desmarest's spiny pocket mouse, Heteromys desmarestianus LC
 Gaumer's spiny pocket mouse, Heteromys gaumeri LC
 Nelson's spiny pocket mouse, Heteromys nelsoni EN
 Cloud-dwelling spiny pocket mouse, Heteromys nubicolens NE
 Mountain spiny pocket mouse, Heteromys oresterus LC
 Painted spiny pocket mouse, Heteromys pictus LC
 Salvin's spiny pocket mouse, Heteromys salvini LC

Suborder: Myomorpha
Family: Cricetidae
Subfamily: Arvicolinae
Genus: Microtus
 Guatemalan vole, Microtus guatemalensis NT
Subfamily: Tylomyinae
Genus: Nyctomys
 Sumichrast's vesper rat, Nyctomys sumichrasti LC
Genus: Otonyctomys
 Hatt's vesper rat, Otonyctomys hatti LC
Genus: Ototylomys
 Big-eared climbing rat, Ototylomys phyllotis LC
Genus: Tylomys
 Chiapan climbing rat, Tylomys bullaris CR
 Fulvous-bellied climbing rat, Tylomys fulviventer DD
 Peters's climbing rat, Tylomys nudicaudus LC
 Panamanian climbing rat, Tylomys panamensis DD
 Tumbala climbing rat, Tylomys tumbalensis CR
 Watson's climbing rat, Tylomys watsoni LC
Subfamily: Neotominae
Genus: Baiomys
 Southern pygmy mouse, Baiomys musculus LC
Genus: Habromys
 Crested-tailed deermouse, Habromys lophurus NT
Genus: Isthmomys
 Yellow isthmus rat, Isthmomys flavidus NT
 Mount Pirri isthmus rat, Isthmomys pirrensis LC
Genus: Neotoma
 Nicaraguan woodrat, Neotoma chrysomelas LC
 Mexican woodrat, Neotoma mexicana LC
Genus: Peromyscus
 Aztec mouse, Peromyscus aztecus LC
 Big deer mouse, Peromyscus grandis NT
 Guatemalan deer mouse, Peromyscus guatemalensis LC
 Naked-eared deer mouse, Peromyscus gymnotis LC
 White-footed mouse, Peromyscus leucopus LC
 Nimble-footed mouse, Peromyscus levipes LC
 Plateau mouse, Peromyscus melanophrys LC
 Maya mouse, Peromyscus mayensis CR
 Mexican deer mouse, Peromyscus mexicanus LC
 Stirton's deer mouse, Peromyscus stirtoni LR
 Yucatan deer mouse, Peromyscus yucatanicus LC
 Chiapan deer mouse, Peromyscus zarhynchus VU
Genus: Reithrodontomys
 Short-nosed harvest mouse, Reithrodontomys brevirostris LC
 Chiriqui harvest mouse, Reithrodontomys creper LC
 Darien harvest mouse, Reithrodontomys darienensis LC
 Fulvous harvest mouse, Reithrodontomys fulvescens LC
 Slender harvest mouse, Reithrodontomys gracilis LC
 Mexican harvest mouse, Reithrodontomys mexicanus LC
 Small-toothed harvest mouse, Reithrodontomys microdon VU
 Nicaraguan harvest mouse, Reithrodontomys paradoxus DD
 Rodriguez's harvest mouse, Reithrodontomys rodriguezi LC
 Cozumel harvest mouse, Reithrodontomys spectabilis CR
 Sumichrast's harvest mouse, Reithrodontomys sumichrasti LC
 Narrow-nosed harvest mouse, Reithrodontomys tenuirostris VU
Genus: Scotinomys
 Alston's brown mouse, Scotinomys teguina LC
 Chiriqui brown mouse, Scotinomys xerampelinus LC
Subfamily: Sigmodontinae
Genus: Handleyomys
 Alfaro's rice rat, Handleyomys alfaroi LC
 Chapman's rice rat, Handleyomys chapmani LC
 Black-eared rice rat, Handleyomys melanotis LC
 Striped rice rat, Handleyomys rhabdops VU
 Long-nosed rice rat, Handleyomys rostratus LC
 Cloud forest rice rat, Handleyomys saturatior NT
Genus: Ichthyomys
 Tweedy's crab-eating rat, Ichthyomys tweedii DD
Genus: Melanomys
 Dusky rice rat, Melanomys caliginosus LC
Genus: Neacomys
 Painted bristly mouse, Neacomys pictus DD
Genus: Nephelomys
 Tomes's rice rat, Nephelomys albigularis LC
 Boquete rice rat, Nephelomys devius LC
Genus: Oecomys
 Bicolored arboreal rice rat, Oecomys bicolor LC
 Trinidad arboreal rice rat, Oecomys trinitatis LC
Genus: Oligoryzomys
 Fulvous pygmy rice rat, Oligoryzomys fulvescens LC
 Sprightly pygmy rice rat, Oligoryzomys vegetus LC
Genus: Oryzomys
 Coues' rice rat, Oryzomys couesi LC
 Nicaraguan rice rat, Oryzomys dimidiatus LC
Genus: Rheomys
 Goldman's water mouse, Rheomys raptor LC
 Thomas's water mouse, Rheomys thomasi NT
 Underwood's water mouse, Rheomys underwoodi LC
Genus: Rhipidomys
 Splendid climbing mouse, Rhipidomys nitela LC
 Broad-footed climbing mouse, Rhipidomys latimanus LC
Genus: Sigmodon
 Southern cotton rat, Sigmodon hirsutus LC
 Jaliscan cotton rat, Sigmodon mascotensis LC
 Toltec cotton rat, Sigmodon toltecus LC
Genus: Sigmodontomys
 Alfaro's rice water rat, Sigmodontomys alfari LC
 Harris's rice water rat, Sigmodontomys aphrastus DD
Genus: Transandinomys
 Bolivar rice rat, Transandinomys bolivaris LC
 Talamancan rice rat, Transandinomys talamancae LC
Genus: Zygodontomys
 Short-tailed cane mouse, Zygodontomys brevicauda LC

Order: Lagomorpha (lagomorphs)

The lagomorphs comprise two families, Leporidae (hares and rabbits), and Ochotonidae (pikas). Though they can resemble rodents, and were classified as a superfamily in that order until the early 20th century, they have since been considered a separate order. They differ from rodents in a number of physical characteristics, such as having four incisors in the upper jaw rather than two. Central America's lagomorph diversity is considerably less than that of Mexico as a whole, but is greater than that of South America.

Family: Leporidae (rabbits, hares)
Genus: Sylvilagus
 Dice's cottontail, Sylvilagus dicei VU
 Eastern cottontail, Sylvilagus floridanus LC
Central American tapetí, Sylvilagus gabbi LC
Northern tapetí, Sylvilagus incitatus NE
Genus: Lepus
 Tehuantepec jackrabbit, Lepus flavigularis EN

Superorder Laurasiatheria

Order: Eulipotyphla (shrews, hedgehogs, moles, and solenodons)

Eulipotyphlans are insectivorous mammals. Shrews and solenodons closely resemble mice, hedgehogs carry spines, while moles are stout-bodied burrowers. Central America's shrew diversity is comparable to that of Mexico as a whole, and is considerably greater than that of South America. Moles are not found in the Americas south of northern Mexico.

Family: Soricidae (shrews)
Subfamily: Soricinae
Genus: Cryptotis
C. mexicana group
 Mexican small-eared shrew, Cryptotis mexicana LC
 goldmani set
 Goldman's broad-clawed shrew, Cryptotis goldmani LC
 Goodwin's broad-clawed shrew, Cryptotis goodwini LC
 Guatemalan broad-clawed shrew, Cryptotis griseoventris VU
 Cryptotis lacertosus NE
 Cryptotis mam NE
C. nigrescens group
 Honduran small-eared shrew, Cryptotis hondurensis DD
 Yucatan small-eared shrew, Cryptotis mayensis LC
 Darién small-eared shrew, Cryptotis mera EN
 Merriam's small-eared shrew, Cryptotis merriami LC
 Blackish small-eared shrew, Cryptotis nigrescens LC
C. parva group
 Central American least shrew, Cryptotis orophila DD
 North American least shrew, Cryptotis parva LC
 Tropical small-eared shrew, Cryptotis tropicalis DD
ungrouped/relict
 Enders's small-eared shrew, Cryptotis endersi EN
 Talamancan small-eared shrew, Cryptotis gracilis VU
Genus: Sorex
 Subgenus: Otisorex
 Verapaz shrew, Sorex veraepacis LC
 Subgenus: incertae sedis
 Saussure's shrew, Sorex saussurei LC
 Sclater's shrew, Sorex sclateri CR
 San Cristobal shrew, Sorex stizodon CR
 Veracruz shrew, Sorex veraecrucis LC

Order: Chiroptera (bats)

The bats' most distinguishing feature is that their forelimbs are developed as wings, making them the only mammals capable of flight. Bat species account for about 20% of all mammals.

Family: Noctilionidae
Genus: Noctilio
 Lesser bulldog bat, Noctilio albiventris LC
 Greater bulldog bat, Noctilio leporinus LC
Family: Vespertilionidae
Subfamily: Myotinae
Genus: Myotis
 Silver-tipped myotis, Myotis albescens LC
 Southwestern myotis, Myotis auriculus LC
 California myotis, Myotis californicus LC
 Guatemalan myotis, Myotis cobanensis DD
 Elegant myotis, Myotis elegans LC
 Cinnamon myotis, Myotis fortidens LC
 Hairy-legged myotis, Myotis keaysi LC
 Black myotis, Myotis nigricans LC
 Montane myotis, Myotis oxyotus LC
 Riparian myotis, Myotis riparius LC
 Fringed myotis, Myotis thysanodes LC
 Cave myotis, Myotis velifer LC
Subfamily: Vespertilioninae
Genus: Bauerus
 Van Gelder's bat, Bauerus dubiaquercus NT
Genus: Eptesicus
 Little black serotine, Eptesicus andinus LC
 Brazilian brown bat, Eptesicus brasiliensis LC
 Chiriquinan serotine, Eptesicus chiriquinus LC
 Argentine brown bat, Eptesicus furinalis LC
 Big brown bat, Eptesicus fuscus LC
Genus: Lasiurus
 Desert red bat, Lasiurus blossevillii LC
 Tacarcuna bat, Lasiurus castaneus DD
 Hoary bat, Lasiurus cinereus LC
 Southern yellow bat, Lasiurus ega LC
 Big red bat, Lasiurus egregius DD
 Northern yellow bat, Lasiurus intermedius LC
Genus: Pipistrellus
 Eastern pipistrelle, Pipistrellus subflavus LC
Genus: Plecotus
 Mexican big-eared bat, Plecotus mexicanus NT
Genus: Rhogeessa
 Yucatan yellow bat, Rhogeessa aeneus LC
 Genoways's yellow bat, Rhogeessa genowaysi EN
 Slender yellow bat, Rhogeessa gracilis LC
 Thomas's yellow bat, Rhogeessa io LC
 Little yellow bat, Rhogeessa parvula LC
 Black-winged little yellow bat, Rhogeessa tumida LC

Family: Molossidae
Genus: Cynomops
 Mexican dog-faced bat, Cynomops mexicanus LC
 Southern dog-faced bat, Cynomops planirostris LC
Genus: Eumops
 Black bonneted bat, Eumops auripendulus LC
 Dwarf bonneted bat, Eumops bonariensis LC
 Wagner's bonneted bat, Eumops glaucinus LC
 Sanborn's bonneted bat, Eumops hansae LC
 Underwood's bonneted bat, Eumops underwoodi LC
Genus: Molossus
 Aztec mastiff bat, Molossus aztecus LC
 Bonda mastiff bat, Molossus currentium LC
 Coiban mastiff bat, Molossus coibensis LC
 Velvety free-tailed bat, Molossus molossus LC
 Miller's mastiff bat, Molossus pretiosus LC
 Black mastiff bat, Molossus rufus LC
 Sinaloan mastiff bat, Molossus sinaloae LC
Genus: Nyctinomops
 Peale's free-tailed bat, Nyctinomops aurispinosus LC
 Broad-eared bat, Nyctinomops laticaudatus LC
 Big free-tailed bat, Nyctinomops macrotis LC
Genus: Promops
 Big crested mastiff bat, Promops centralis LC
Genus: Tadarida
 Mexican free-tailed bat, Tadarida brasiliensis LC
Family: Emballonuridae
Genus: Balantiopteryx
 Thomas's sac-winged bat, Balantiopteryx io VU
 Gray sac-winged bat, Balantiopteryx plicata LC
Genus: Cormura
 Chestnut sac-winged bat, Cormura brevirostris LC
Genus: Cyttarops
 Short-eared bat, Cyttarops alecto LC
Genus: Diclidurus
 Northern ghost bat, Diclidurus albus LC
Genus: Peropteryx
 Greater dog-like bat, Peropteryx kappleri LC
 Lesser doglike bat, Peropteryx macrotis LC
Genus: Rhynchonycteris
 Proboscis bat, Rhynchonycteris naso LC
Genus: Saccopteryx
 Greater sac-winged bat, Saccopteryx bilineata LC
 Lesser sac-winged bat, Saccopteryx leptura LC

Family: Mormoopidae
Genus: Mormoops
 Ghost-faced bat, Mormoops megalophylla LC 
Genus: Pteronotus 
 Davy's naked-backed bat, Pteronotus davyi LC
 Big naked-backed bat, Pteronotus gymnonotus LC
 Parnell's mustached bat, Pteronotus parnellii LC
 Wagner's mustached bat, Pteronotus personatus LC

Family: Phyllostomidae
Subfamily: Phyllostominae
Genus: Chrotopterus
 Big-eared woolly bat, Chrotopterus auritus LC
Genus: Glyphonycteris
 Davies's big-eared bat, Glyphonycteris daviesi LC
 Tricolored big-eared bat, Glyphonycteris sylvestris LC
Genus: Lampronycteris
 Yellow-throated big-eared bat, Lampronycteris brachyotis LC
Genus: Lonchorhina
 Tomes's sword-nosed bat, Lonchorhina aurita LC
Genus: Lophostoma
 Pygmy round-eared bat, Lophostoma brasiliense LC
 Davis's round-eared bat, Lophostoma evotis LC
 White-throated round-eared bat, Lophostoma silvicolum LC
Genus: Macrophyllum
 Long-legged bat, Macrophyllum macrophyllum LC
Genus: Macrotus
 Waterhouse's leaf-nosed bat, Macrotus waterhousii LC
Genus: Micronycteris
 Hairy big-eared bat, Micronycteris hirsuta LC
 White-bellied big-eared bat, Micronycteris minuta LC
 Schmidts's big-eared bat, Micronycteris schmidtorum LC
Genus: Mimon
 Cozumelan golden bat, Mimon cozumelae LC
 Striped hairy-nosed bat, Mimon crenulatum LC
Genus: Phylloderma
 Pale-faced bat, Phylloderma stenops LC
Genus: Phyllostomus
 Pale spear-nosed bat, Phyllostomus discolor LC
 Greater spear-nosed bat, Phyllostomus hastatus LC
Genus: Tonatia
 Stripe-headed round-eared bat, Tonatia saurophila LC
Genus: Trachops
 Fringe-lipped bat, Trachops cirrhosus LC
Genus: Trinycteris
 Niceforo's big-eared bat, Trinycteris nicefori LC
Genus: Vampyrum
 Spectral bat, Vampyrum spectrum NT
Subfamily: Glossophaginae
Genus: Anoura
 Handley's tailless bat, Anoura cultrata NT
 Geoffroy's tailless bat, Anoura geoffroyi LC
Genus: Choeroniscus
 Godman's long-tailed bat, Choeroniscus godmani LC
Genus: Choeronycteris
 Mexican long-tongued bat, Choeronycteris mexicana NT
Genus: Glossophaga
 Commissaris's long-tongued bat, Glossophaga commissarisi LC
 Gray long-tongued bat, Glossophaga leachii LC
 Western long-tongued bat, Glossophaga morenoi LC
 Pallas's long-tongued bat, Glossophaga soricina LC
Genus: Hylonycteris
 Underwood's long-tongued bat, Hylonycteris underwoodi LC
Genus: Leptonycteris
 Southern long-nosed bat, Leptonycteris curasoae VU
 Greater long-nosed bat, Leptonycteris nivalis EN
Genus: Lichonycteris
 Dark long-tongued bat, Lichonycteris obscura LC
Genus: Lionycteris
 Chestnut long-tongued bat, Lionycteris spurrelli LC
Genus: Lonchophylla
 Goldman's nectar bat, Lonchophylla concava NT
 Godman's nectar bat, Lonchophylla mordax LC
 Orange nectar bat, Lonchophylla robusta LC
 Thomas's nectar bat, Lonchophylla thomasi LC
Subfamily: Carolliinae
Genus: Carollia
 Silky short-tailed bat, Carollia brevicauda LC
 Chestnut short-tailed bat, Carollia castanea LC
 Seba's short-tailed bat, Carollia perspicillata LC
 Sowell's short-tailed bat, Carollia sowelli LC
 Gray short-tailed bat, Carollia subrufa LC
Subfamily: Stenodermatinae
Genus: Ametrida
 Little white-shouldered bat, Ametrida centurio LC
Genus: Artibeus
 Honduran fruit-eating bat, Artibeus inopinatus DD
 Jamaican fruit bat, Artibeus jamaicensis LC
 Great fruit-eating bat, Artibeus lituratus LC
Genus: Centurio
 Wrinkle-faced bat, Centurio senex LC
Genus: Chiroderma
 Salvin's big-eyed bat, Chiroderma salvini LC
 Little big-eyed bat, Chiroderma trinitatum LC
 Hairy big-eyed bat, Chiroderma villosum LC
Genus: Dermanura
 Aztec fruit-eating bat, Dermanura azteca LC
 Pygmy fruit-eating bat, Dermanura phaeotis LC
 Toltec fruit-eating bat, Dermanura tolteca LC
 Thomas's fruit-eating bat, Dermanura watsoni LC
 Solitary fruit-eating bat, Dermanura watsoni incomitata CR
Genus: Ectophylla
 Honduran white bat, Ectophylla alba NT
Genus: Enchisthenes
 Velvety fruit-eating bat, Enchisthenes hartii LC
Genus: Mesophylla
 MacConnell's bat, Mesophylla macconnelli LC
Genus: Platyrrhinus
 Thomas's broad-nosed bat, Platyrrhinus dorsalis LC
 Heller's broad-nosed bat, Platyrrhinus helleri LC
 Greater broad-nosed bat, Platyrrhinus vittatus LC
Genus: Sturnira
 Little yellow-shouldered bat, Sturnira lilium LC
 Highland yellow-shouldered bat, Sturnira ludovici LC
 Louis's yellow-shouldered bat, Sturnira luisi LC
 Talamancan yellow-shouldered bat, Sturnira mordax NT
Genus: Uroderma
 Tent-making bat, Uroderma bilobatum LC
 Brown tent-making bat, Uroderma magnirostrum LC
Genus: Vampyressa
 Striped yellow-eared bat, Vampyressa nymphaea LC
Genus: Vampyrodes
 Great stripe-faced bat, Vampyrodes caraccioli LC
Subfamily: Desmodontinae
Genus: Desmodus
 Common vampire bat, Desmodus rotundus LC
Genus: Diaemus
 White-winged vampire bat, Diaemus youngi LC
Genus: Diphylla
 Hairy-legged vampire bat, Diphylla ecaudata LC
Family: Natalidae (funnel-eared bats)
Genus: Natalus
 Mexican greater funnel-eared bat, Natalus mexicanus LC
Family: Furipteridae
Genus: Furipterus
 Thumbless bat, Furipterus horrens LC
Family: Thyropteridae
Genus: Thyroptera
 Peters's disk-winged bat, Thyroptera discifera LC
 Spix's disk-winged bat, Thyroptera tricolor LC

Order: Carnivora (carnivorans)

There are over 260 species of carnivorans, the majority of which feed primarily on meat. They have a characteristic skull shape and dentition. All of Central America's terrestrial carnivorans are of Nearctic origin. Central America has the greatest diversity of procyonids in the world. Large extinct carnivorans that lived in the area prior to the coming of humans include the saber-toothed cat Smilodon fatalis, the scimitar cat Homotherium serum, American lions, dire wolves and short-faced bears.

Suborder: Feliformia
Family: Felidae (cats)
Subfamily: Felinae
Genus: Herpailurus
 Jaguarundi, H. yagouaroundi LC
Genus: Leopardus
 Ocelot, Leopardus pardalis LC
 Oncilla, Leopardus tigrinus VU
 Margay, Leopardus wiedii NT
Genus: Puma
 Cougar, Puma concolor LC
Subfamily: Pantherinae
Genus: Panthera
 Jaguar, Panthera onca NT
Suborder: Caniformia
Family: Canidae (dogs, foxes)
Subfamily: Caninae
Genus: Canis
 Coyote, Canis latrans LC
Genus: Cerdocyon
Crab-eating fox, Cerdocyon thous LC
Genus: Speothos
 Bush dog, Speothos venaticus NT
Genus: Urocyon
 Gray fox, Urocyon cinereoargenteus LC
Family: Ursidae (bears)
Subfamily: Tremarctinae
Genus: Tremarctos
 Spectacled bear, Tremarctos ornatus VU
Family: Procyonidae (raccoons, coatis and relatives)
Genus: Bassariscus
Ringtail, Bassariscus astutus LC
 Cacomistle, Bassariscus sumichrasti LC
Genus: Procyon
 Crab-eating raccoon, Procyon cancrivorus LC
 Common raccoon, Procyon lotor LC
 Cozumel Island raccoon, Procyon pygmaeus CR
Genus: Nasua
 White-nosed coati, Nasua narica LC
 Cozumel Island coati, N. n. nelsoni EN
Genus: Bassaricyon
 Northern olingo, Bassaricyon gabbii LC
 Western lowland olingo, Bassaricyon medius LC
Genus: Potos
 Kinkajou, Potos flavus LC
Family: Mustelidae (weasels, otters)
Subfamily: Guloninae
Genus: Eira
 Tayra, Eira barbara LC
Subfamily: Ictonychinae
Genus: Galictis
 Greater grison, Galictis vittata LC
Subfamily: Mustelinae
Genus: Neogale
 Long-tailed weasel, N. frenata LC
Subfamily: Lutrinae
Genus: Lontra
 Neotropical otter, Lontra longicaudis NT
Family: Mephitidae (skunks)
Genus: Spilogale
 Southern spotted skunk, Spilogale angustifrons LC
 Pygmy spotted skunk, Spilogale pygmaea VU
Genus: Mephitis
 Hooded skunk, Mephitis macroura LC
Genus: Conepatus
 American hog-nosed skunk, Conepatus leuconotus LC
 Striped hog-nosed skunk, Conepatus semistriatus LC
Clade: Pinnipedia (seals, sea lions and walruses)
Family: Phocidae (earless seals)
Subfamily: Monachinae
Genus: Neomonachus
 Caribbean monk seal, N. tropicalis EX

Order: Perissodactyla (odd-toed ungulates)

The odd-toed ungulates are browsing and grazing mammals. They are usually large to very large, and have relatively simple stomachs and a large middle toe. While native equids once lived in the region, having evolved in North America over a period of 50 million years, they died out around the time of the first arrival of humans, along with at least one ungulate of South American origin, the notoungulate, Mixotoxodon. Sequencing of collagen from a fossil of one recently extinct notoungulate has indicated that this order was closer to the perissodactyls than any extant mammal order.

Family: Tapiridae (tapirs)
Genus: Tapirus
 Baird's tapir, Tapirus bairdii EN

Order: Artiodactyla (even-toed ungulates and cetaceans)

The weight of even-toed ungulates is borne about equally by the third and fourth toes, rather than mostly or entirely by the third as in perissodactyls. There are about 220 noncetacean artiodactyl species, including many that are of great economic importance to humans. All of Central America's extant ungulates are of Nearctic origin. Prior to the arrival of humans, Nearctic camelids also lived in the region.

Family: Tayassuidae (peccaries)
Genus: Dicotyles
 Collared peccary, Dicotyles tajacu LC
Genus: Tayassu
 White-lipped peccary, Tayassu pecari NT
Family: Cervidae (deer)
Subfamily: Capreolinae
Genus: Mazama
 Amazonian brown brocket, Mazama nemorivaga LC
 Central American red brocket, Mazama temama DD
Genus: Odocoileus
 Yucatan brown brocket, O. pandora VU
 White-tailed deer, O. virginianus LC

Infraorder: Cetacea (whales, dolphins and porpoises)

The infraorder Cetacea includes whales, dolphins and porpoises. They are the mammals most fully adapted to aquatic life with a spindle-shaped nearly hairless body, protected by a thick layer of blubber, and forelimbs and tail modified to provide propulsion underwater. Their closest extant relatives are the hippos, which are artiodactyls, from which cetaceans descended; cetaceans are thus also artiodactyls.

Parvorder: Mysticeti
Family: Balaenopteridae (rorquals)
Subfamily: Balaenopterinae
Genus: Balaenoptera
 Bryde's whale, Balaenoptera edeni DD
 Blue whale, Balaenoptera musculus EN
 Fin whale, Balaenoptera physalus VU
Subfamily: Megapterinae
Genus: Megaptera
 Humpback whale, Megaptera novaeangliae LC
Parvorder: Odontoceti
Family: Physeteridae (sperm whales)
Genus: Physeter
 Sperm whale, Physeter macrocephalus VU
Family: Kogiidae (pygmy and dwarf sperm whales)
Genus: Kogia
 Pygmy sperm whale, Kogia breviceps DD
 Dwarf sperm whale, Kogia sima DD
Family: Ziphidae (beaked whales)
Genus: Ziphius
 Cuvier's beaked whale, Ziphius cavirostris LC
Genus: Mesoplodon
 Blainville's beaked whale, Mesoplodon densirostris DD
 Ginkgo-toothed beaked whale, Mesoplodon ginkgodens DD
 Pygmy beaked whale, Mesoplodon peruvianus DD
Family: Delphinidae (marine dolphins)
Genus: Steno
 Rough-toothed dolphin, Steno bredanensis LC
Genus: Sotalia
 Guiana dolphin, Sotalia guianensis NT
Genus: Tursiops
 Bottlenose dolphin, Tursiops truncatus LC
Genus: Stenella
 Pantropical spotted dolphin, Stenella attenuata LC
 Clymene dolphin, Stenella clymene LC
 Striped dolphin, Stenella coeruleoalba LC
 Atlantic spotted dolphin, Stenella frontalis LC
 Spinner dolphin, Stenella longirostris LC
Genus: Delphinus
 Long-beaked common dolphin, Delphinus capensis DD
 Short-beaked common dolphin, Delphinus delphis LC
Genus: Lagenodelphis
 Fraser's dolphin, Lagenodelphis hosei LC
Genus: Grampus
 Risso's dolphin, Grampus griseus LC
Genus: Peponocephala
 Melon-headed whale, Peponocephala electra LC
Genus: FeresaLC
 Pygmy killer whale, Feresa attenuata LC
Genus: Orcinus
 Orca, Orcinus orca DD
Genus: Pseudorca
 False killer whale, Pseudorca crassidens NT
Genus: Globicephala
 Short-finned pilot whale, Globicephala macrorhynchus LC

See also
List of chordate orders
Lists of mammals by region
List of prehistoric mammals
Mammal classification
List of mammals described in the 2000s

Notes

References

Lists of Western Hemisphere mammals from north to south

 01
Central America